Siegfried Simsch (6 September 1913 – 8 June 1944) was a German Luftwaffe military aviator and fighter ace during World War II. He is credited with 54 aerial victories, all of which claimed on the Eastern Front, achieved in approximately 400 combat missions.

Born in Posen and half Jewish, Simsch joined the military service in the Luftwaffe. Following flight training, he was posted to Jagdgeschwader 134 "Horst Wessel" (JG 134—134th Fighter Wing) before World War II. In late 1940, Simsch was transferred to Jagdgeschwader 52 (JG 52—52nd Fighter Wing) and fought against the Royal Air Force (RAF). During Operation Barbarossa, the German invasion of the Soviet Union, he claimed his first aerial victory on 22 June 1941. In September 1941, he was made Staffelkapitän (squadron leader) of 5. Staffel (5th squadron) of JG 52. Simsch was awarded the Knight's Cross of the Iron Cross on 1 July 1942. In November of that year, he was severely wounded in a flight accident, grounding him for a year. In November 1943, Simsch was transferred to Jagdgeschwader 11 (JG 11—11th Fighter Wing), a unit fighting in Defense of the Reich. On 1 June 1944, he was appointed Gruppenkommandeur (group commander) of I. Gruppe of JG 11. One week later, and two days after the Normandy landings, Simsch was shot down and killed in action on 8 June 1944 over Rennes, France.

Early life and career
Simsch was born on 6 September 1913 in Posen, present-day Poznań in west-central Poland, at the time the capital of the Province of Posen, a Prussian province of the German Empire. Despite being half Jewish, or Mischling under the Nuremberg Laws, he enlisted in the Luftwaffe and served with distinction. Following flight training, he was posted to Jagdgeschwader 134 "Horst Wessel" (JG 134—134th Fighter Wing).

World War II
World War II in Europe began on Friday 1 September 1939 when German forces invaded Poland. In late 1940, Simsch was posted to 5. Staffel (5th squadron) of Jagdgeschwader 52 (JG 52—52nd Fighter Wing). The Staffel was commanded by Oberleutnant August-Wilhelm Schumann and subordinated to II. Gruppe of JG 52 which was headed by Hauptmann Wilhelm Ensslen. On 2 November, Ensslen was killed in action and replaced by Hauptmann Erich Woitke.

On 15 April 1941, the Luftwaffe ordered an attack on the Royal Air Force (RAF) airfield at Manston. Due to adverse weather conditions, the attack was called off and only a Schwarm, a flight of four aircraft, under the leadership of Simsch, was assumed to have reached the target. The flight however had found the Luftwaffe airfield at Saint-Omer where II. Gruppe of Jagdgeschwader 53 (JG 53—53rd Fighter Wing) was based. In the attack, the Schwarm destroyed nine aircraft, wounding two pilots and five technicians. The pilots Simsch, Feldwebel Georg Mayr, Gefreiter Adolf Glunz and Unteroffizier Hans Sembill were punished by Hermann Göring personally. In addition, Simsch's advancement in career—he had been scheduled to become a Staffelkapitän (squadron leader) prior to this event—was deferred.

According to Barbas, Simsch claimed an unconfirmed aerial victory over a RAF Supermarine Spitfire north of Dover on 19 May 1941. This claim is not listed by Prien, Stemmer, Rodeike and Bock.

Operation Barbarossa
In preparation of Operation Barbarossa, the German invasion of the Soviet Union, II. Gruppe of JG 52, without a period of replenishment in Germany, was ordered to airfields close to the German-Soviet demarcation line. While the Gruppenstab (group headquarters unit) and 4. Staffel were based at Suwałki in northeastern Poland, 5. and 6. Staffel were transferred to a forward airfield at Sobolewo. For the invasion, II. Gruppe of JG 52 was subordinated to the Geschwaderstab (headquarters unit) of Jagdgeschwader 27 (JG 27—27th Fighter Wing). The Geschwader was part of the VIII. Fliegerkorps commanded by Generaloberst Wolfram Freiherr von Richthofen which supported the northern wing of Army Group Centre. 

On 22 June, the German forces launched the attack on the Soviet Union which opened the Eastern Front. That day, Simsch claimed his first aerial victory. He was credited with shooting down a Polikarpov I-15 fighter west of Varėna. On 28 June, II. Gruppe moved to an airfield at Maladzyechna where they stayed until 4 July. Here Simsch claimed two Polikarpov R-Z reconnaissance bomber aircraft shot down on 1 July. Three days later, II. Gruppe moved further east to an airfield at Sloboda, east of Minsk before moving to Lyepyel on 5 July. Fyling from Lyepyel, Simsch claimed a Petlyakov Pe-2 bomber shot down on 7 July and an Ilyushin DB-3 bomber on 9 July. On 13 July, the Gruppe moved to Kamary, an airfield in the western parts of Vitebsk.

On 6 September 1941, Simsch succeeded Oberleutnant August-Wilhelm Schumann as Staffelkapitän of 5. Staffel of JG 52. Schumann had been killed in action that day. II. There, Simsch claimed two I-61 fighters, an early German designation for the Mikoyan-Gurevich MiG-3 fighter, one each on 2 and 4 December, in combat near Moscow.

Eastern Front
On 29 May 1942, Simsch was wounded in combat with a Soviet bomber. During his convalescence, he was replaced by Leutnant Waldemar Semelka (29 May – 30 June 1942) and later by Leutnant Heinz Schmidt (1 July – 30 September 1942). On 1 July, Simsch was awarded the Knight's Cross of the Iron Cross for 45 aerial victories. Simsch was one of four JG 52 pilots presented with the Knight's Cross that day. The other three pilots to receive the distinction that day were Feldwebel Alfred Grislawski, Feldwebel Karl Steffen and Unteroffizier Karl Gratz.

On 3 November 1942, engine failure of his Bf 109 G-2 (Werknummer 13711—factory number) resulted in a forced landing northwest of Maykop. Simsch was severely injured in the accident. Oberfeldwebel Willi Nemitz then briefly led 5. Staffel before Oberleutnant Gustav Denk officially took command of the Staffel in January 1943.

Defense of the Reich
On 30 November 1943, following a lengthy period of convalescence, Simsch was transferred to Jagdgeschwader 11 (JG 11—11th Fighter Wing) where he was appointed Staffelkapitän of 10. Staffel. He replaced Oberleutnant Günter Witt. On 17 May 1944, seven RAF North American P-51 Mustang fighters from the Second Tactical Air Force attacked the Aalborg Airfield in Denmark. The RAF fighters claimed nine aerial victories before 10. Staffel intercepted the RAF fighters. In the pursuit, two No. 122 Squadron P-51 fighters were shot down, including one by Simsch.

On 1 June 1944, he was appointed Gruppenkommandeur (group commander) of I. Gruppe of JG 11 to replace Oberleutnant Hans-Heinrich Koenig who was killed in action on 24 May. One week later, and two days after the Normandy landings Siegfried Simsch was shot down by a North American P-51 Mustang and killed on 8 June 1944 over Rennes, France. His Focke Wulf Fw 190 A-8 (Werknummer 730448) crashed near Vitré.

Summary of career

Aerial victory claims
According to Obermaier, Simsch was credited with 54 aerial victories claimed in approximately 400 combat missions. The author Rigg however lists him with 95 aerial victories claimed. Mathews and Foreman, authors of Luftwaffe Aces — Biographies and Victory Claims, researched the German Federal Archives and found records for 54 aerial victory claims, all of which claimed on the Eastern Front.

Victory claims were logged to a map-reference (PQ = Planquadrat), for example "PQ 95754". These sectors were then subdivided into 36 smaller units to give a location area 3 × 4 km in size.

Awards
 Honor Goblet of the Luftwaffe on 20 December 1941 as Oberleutnant and pilot
 Knight's Cross of the Iron Cross on 1 July 1942 as Oberleutnant and Staffelkapitän of the 5./Jagdgeschwader 52

Notes

References

Citations

Bibliography

 
 
 
 
 
 
 
 
 
 
 
 
 
 
 
 
 
 
 

1913 births
1944 deaths
Military personnel from Poznań
People from the Province of Posen
German World War II flying aces
Recipients of the Knight's Cross of the Iron Cross
Luftwaffe personnel killed in World War II
Aviators killed by being shot down